

References 

Additional sources

 
 

G